Dorippoidea is a superfamily of crabs. The earliest fossils attributable to the Dorippoidea date from the Late Cretaceous.

References

Crabs
Extant Late Cretaceous first appearances
Arthropod superfamilies